Tugomir Franc (8 February 1932 – 5 January 1983), was a Yugoslavian opera singer (bass).

Life 
Born in Zagreb, Kingdom of Yugoslavia, Franc was trained at the Zagreb Conservatory by Zlatko Sir and Lav Vrbanik and then in Vienna by Elisabeth Radó. From the end of the 1950s he sang frequently at the Vienna State Opera and at the Bayreuth Festival, among others under the direction of Herbert von Karajan (as Titurel in Parsifal in 1961, and in  Tannhäuser in 1963). From 1964 to 1965 he also sang at the Salzburg Festival. As a guest he was active in Bordeaux, Nancy, Toulouse, Rome, Turin, Frankfurt am Main, Stockholm, Geneva, Belgrade and Zagreb as well as at the Vienna Volksoper.

Franc had a warm, deep voice and clear diction, despite a slight Balkan accent. He was also successful as a concert and oratorio singer.

Bibliography 
 Andrea Harrandt: Franc, Tugomir. In Oesterreichisches Musiklexikon. Inline-edition, Vienna 2002, ; printed edition: volume 1, editions of the Austrian Academy of Sciences, Vienna 2002, .

References

External links 
 
 Franc, Tugomi on Ludwig Maximilian University
 Tugomir Franc on Wiener-staatsoper  
 

1932 births
1983 deaths
Musicians from Zagreb
Operatic basses
Yugoslav male opera singers